Gavri Levy (24 December 1937 – 16 August 2018), also known as Gavri Levi was an Israeli dancer, choreographer who also served as a chairman of the Israel Football Association from 1996 to 2003. His son Guy Levy is a former professional footballer.

Career 
He emerged as a renowned choreographer in Israel and had worked as a choreographer on several Israeli television shows. He also served as a judge on the Israeli TV programme Rokdim Im Kokhavim ("Dancing with the Stars").

Death 
He died on the morning of 16 August 2018, aged 80, after being hospitalized for a serious illness in the previous few weeks.

References

External links 

1937 births
2018 deaths
Israeli male stage actors
Israeli male dancers
Israeli television personalities
Israeli choreographers
People from Petah Tikva
Israeli people of Bulgarian-Jewish descent
Burials at Segula Cemetery
Chairmen of the Israel Football Association